Delias dorimene is a butterfly in the family Pieridae. It was described by Caspar Stoll in 1782. It is found in the Australasian realm.

Subspecies
Delias dorimene dorimene (Ambon)
Delias dorimene avenda Fruhstorfer, 1912 (Ceram)

References

External links
Delias at Markku Savela's Lepidoptera and Some Other Life Forms

dorimene
Butterflies of Asia
Butterflies of Australia
Taxa named by Caspar Stoll
Butterflies described in 1782